Who the (Bleep) Did I Marry? is an American documentary television series on Investigation Discovery. The series debuted on August 25, 2010. The series tells the story of people - mostly women - who find out their spouse has committed a crime before or during their marriage.  After a seven year hiatus, the series returned on October 15, 2022 for Season 7.  Unlike the previous seasons, Season 7's episodes run for a full hour.

Series overview

The series covered some of the most notorious American cases from recent years including: Gary Ridgway, Amy Fisher, John Allen Muhammad, Jodi Arias, Michael Mastromarino, Scott Peterson, Scott Erskine and more.

Who the (Bleep)... 
The show received a spinoff named Who the (Bleep)... where ex-neighbours and friends tell their stories in a similar fashion.

References

External links

2010s American documentary television series
2010 American television series debuts
2015 American television series endings
Investigation Discovery original programming